William Thomas Kent (April 29, 1886 - October 5, 1945) was an American stage actor who later appeared in sound films. He was born in St. Paul, Minnesota and died in New York City.

Kent's career traversed many forms of entertainment (i.e. Broadway, vaudeville, burlesque, minstrel (at age 14), circus, and silent and sound films). Between 1918 and 1935, he appeared in thirteen Broadway shows, including two Gershwin musicals, Funny Face (1927) and Girl Crazy (1930). In 1922, he appeared with Marion Davies in the silent When Knighthood Was in Flower. He turned up in The Scarlet Letter (1934).

Filmography
When Knighthood Was in Flower (1922)
Wall Tell Tales (1928, short film)
King of Jazz (1930)
Saturday's Millions (1933)
The Scarlet Letter (1934)

References

External links
, accessed July 26, 2015

William Kent portrait (second portrait w/ moustache only) at NY Public Library website; accessed July 26, 2015.
William T. Kent profile, alexanderstreet.com, North American Theatre Online; accessed July 26, 2015.
grave of William Kent profile, findagrave.com; accessed July 26, 2015.

1886 births
1945 deaths
Male actors from Saint Paul, Minnesota
American male film actors
American male stage actors
20th-century American male actors